Por amar sin ley is a Mexican telenovela produced by José Alberto Castro that premiered on Las Estrellas on 12 February 2018. It is a remake of a 2016 Colombian telenovela La ley del corazón. The telenovela revolves around the personal life and work of a group of lawyers belonging to a prestigious law firm.

Main characters

Alejandra Ponce 
Portrayed by Ana Brenda Contreras, Alejandra Ponce is a lawyer specialized in family law. During her wedding to Carlos, the police arrest him interrupting the wedding. After a while Alejandra gets to know Ricardo, and thanks to him she starts working at Vegas y Asociados.

Ricardo Bustamante 
Portrayed by David Zepeda, Ricardo Bustamante he is a senior lawyer in family law. Ricardo is a straight-laced and honorable man. When his wife Elena is unfaithful to him, he decides to divorce her. Ricardo has two stepchildren, Federico and Natalia, whom he considers his own children.

Carlos Ibarra 
Portrayed by Julián Gil, Carlos Ibarra is a renowned lawyer. Carlos is best known as a criminal lawyer representing various defendants accused of serious crimes including murder. He is ambitious and is willing to do anything necessary to get more money and power. On the day of his wedding to Alejandra, he was arrested for accused of the murder of Patricia, a sex worker who was with him the night before his wedding.

Roberto Morelli 
Portrayed by José María Torre Hütt,  Roberto Morelli is a lawyer of Vegas y Asociados. He is a womanizing man who likes to take and go to parties. Roberto is Leonardo's best friend. He tries to conquer Victoria, but she does not let herself be easily fall in love by him.

Gustavo Soto 
Portrayed by Sergio Basañez, Gustavo Soto is a prestigious lawyer of Vegas y Asociados. Gustavo maintains a relationship with Milena, his lover. But after realizing that what she did was wrong, he decides to end her lover, but when Milena frustrated and feels betrayed by Gustavo, she does everything possible to make her marriage to Isabel come to an end.

Victoria Escalante 
Portrayed by Altair Jarabo, Victoria Escalante she is a lawyer, a specialist in family cases. She has a romantic interest with Roberto, but since she is a feminist woman who believes that men are not necessary for a woman to be powerful, she decides to ignore him. Victoria is a brave woman who fights and defends the rights of women.

Alonso Vega 
Portrayed by Guillermo García Cantú, Alonso Vega he is the owner of the law firm Vega y Asociados. Alonso is the one who advises and keeps track of all the cases his lawyers have.

Benjamín Acosta 
Portrayed by Pablo Valentín, Benjamín Acosta is an ambitious lawyer of the company Vega Y Asociado. Benjamín has a wife and children, but maintains a relationship with Leticia, and with her he tries to do everything possible to be recognized for his efforts in the company.

Olivia Suárez 
Portrayed by Ilithya Manzanilla, Olivia Suárez she is a dedicated lawyer in cases of family abuse. Olivia is a sensitive and romantic woman who believes in love. She is secretly in love with Leonardo his platonic love.

Elena Fernández 
Portrayed by Geraldine Bazán, Elena Fernández is the mother of Federico and Natalia. As a result of a clandestine relationship that took place outside of her marriage, Elena divorces Ricardo, but she does not accept having divorced so she tries to get Ricardo back.

Alan Páez 
Portrayed by Moisés Arizmendi, Alan Páez he is Carlos's cousin. He is a mediocre lawyer who only feels envy and hatred towards his cousin, since he is more recognized in the professional field.

Leonardo Morán 
Portrayed by Manuel Balbi, Leonardo Morán is a lawyer for Vegas y Asociados. Leonardo is a handsome, reserved, intelligent, serious and very professional man, man in his forties. A lawyer specialized in criminal law, dedicated to his work. He is Ricardo Bustamante's best friend and is always there to give him good advice. Leonardo is a very correct, ethical and responsible man, that is why he has a lot of credibility, both in the law firm and in the courts of Mexico City.

Special guest stars

Introduced in season one 

 
 María José as Patricia Linares
 David Ostrosky as Saúl Morales
 Ricardo Fastlicht as Méndez
 María José Magán as Ana María
 Gilberto Romo as Daniela Segura
 Jade Fraser as Rocío
 Alejandro Ibarra as Darío
 Ana Patricia Rojo as Lina
 Jacqueline Andere as Virginia
 Lisette Morelos as Mariana
 Joshua Gutiérrez as Fermín
 Fabián Robles as Pérez
 Zaide Silvia Gutiérrez as Silvia
 Dobrina Cristeva as Jimena
 Natalia Juárez as Anita
 Aleida Núñez as Milena
 Raúl Magaña as Raúl
 Andrea Ortega-Lee as Rosita
 Sofía Castro as Nora
 Nuria Bages as Cinthya
 Jesús Ochoa as Taxista
 Marco Muñoz as Ojeda
 Pilar Ixquic Mata as Laura
 Alex Sirvent as Arturo
 José Elías Moreno as Joel
 Ernesto D'Alessio as Agustín
 Margarita Magaña as Lorenza
 Gabriela Zamora as Lupita
 Gloria Aura as Inés
 Daniela Noguez as Claudia
 José Carlos Ruiz as Armando
 Aitor Iturrioz as Óscar
 Rodrigo Cuevas as Patricio
 Pepe Olivares as Lara
 Carlos Gatica as Rodrigo
 Andrea Torre as Nuria
 Toño Mauri as Dr. Ávalos
 Luis Xavier as Papá Gutiérrez
 Claudia Acosta as Florentina
 Juan Carlos Nava as Tomás
 Renata Notni as Sol
 Adal Ramones as Alberto
 Laura Carmine as Berenice
 Danna García as Fanny
 José Ron as Ramón
 Pedro Prieto as Alfonso
 Macaria as Marcia
 Silvia Manríquez as Melisa
 Carmen Becerra as Ligia
 Luis Romano as Fabián
 Daniela Luján as Valeria
 Alejandra Zaid as Alexa
 Ernesto Gómez Cruz as Plutarco

References 

Por amar sin ley
Por amar sin ley